The 2016 Montreux Volley Masters is a women's volleyball competition set in Montreux, Switzerland.

Participating teams

Squads

Group stage

Group A 

|}

|}

Group B 

|}

|}

Classification round

|}

Final round

Semifinal 

|}

Third place match

|}

Final

|}

Final standings

Awards

Most Valuable Player
  Hui Ruoqi
Best Outside Spikers	
  Hui Ruoqi
  Ajcharaporn Kongyot
Best Libero
  Piyanut Pannoy
	
Best Middle Blockers	
  Zhang Xiaoya
  Hattaya Bamrungsuk
Best Setter
  Nootsara Tomkom
Best Opposite Spiker
  Gong Xiangyu

References

2016
Montreux Volley Masters
Montreux Volley Masters